Clement Coughlan (14 August 1942 – 1 February 1983) was an Irish Fianna Fáil politician and school teacher from County Donegal. He was first elected to Dáil Éireann in a 1980 by-election as a Fianna Fáil Teachta Dála (TD) for Donegal. He only served in public office for two years before his death in a road traffic accident on 1 February 1983. In a morbid twist his death and the timing of his funeral is considered to be the deciding factor in keeping Charles Haughey as leader of Fianna Fáil, when the support for the campaign to oust him dwindled following the funeral. Coughlan's brother, Cathal Coughlan, was elected in the subsequent by-election. His niece, Mary Coughlan was also a TD and Minister.

He also played at senior level for the Donegal county football team.

See also
Families in the Oireachtas

References

1942 births
1983 deaths
Clement
Donegal inter-county Gaelic footballers
Fianna Fáil TDs
Irish sportsperson-politicians
Members of the 21st Dáil
Members of the 22nd Dáil
Members of the 23rd Dáil
Members of the 24th Dáil
Road incident deaths in the Republic of Ireland